Alemannia Aachen competed in the 2. Bundesliga in the 2009-10 season.

Transfers

In:

Out:

Players

Appearances and goals
Appearance and goalscoring records for all the players who are in the Alemannia Aachen first team squad during the 2009–10 season.

|}

2. Bundesliga

ResultsNote: Results are given with Alemannia Aachen score listed first.DFB-Pokal

ResultsNote: Results are given with Alemannia Aachen score listed first.''

References

Alemannia Aachen seasons
Alemannia Aachen